A certification listing is a document used to guide installations of certified products, against which a field installation is compared to make sure that it complies with a regulation (e.g., a building code). Typically, products or items are required to be installed or used in accordance with a subject-related certification listing if those products or items are subject to product certification and must be used in a specific manner in order to be safe for use. Certification listings are issued by organisations that are usually nationally accredited for doing both testing and product certification work, in accordance with nationally accredited standards.

Description 
A certification listing is a document used to guide installations of certified products. After a field installation is completed, it is compared to the list to make sure that it complies with a regulation (e.g., a building code). Often, products or items are required—by law, void of warranty, or other means—to be installed or used in accordance with a subject-related certification listing if those products or items are subject to product certification and must be used in a specific manner in order to be safe for use.

Organizations 

Certification listings are issued by organisations that are usually nationally accredited for doing both testing and product certification work, in accordance with nationally accredited standards. Underwriter Laboratories certifications are commonly seen on products for sale in the United States.

Example of fire door test 
The following pictures illustrate an example of a successful fire test that led to a UL listing or a three-hour fire protection rating. The entire assembly is exposed to a fire for the specified amount of time per the objective of the test. Following this heat exposure, a hose stream is applied to the door. Fire doors and fire dampers are derated from the fire barriers they are in. In this case, a 3-hour rated door is acceptable for use in up to a 4-hour wall. Because it goes into a 4-hour wall, it received a 45PSI (31N/cm²) hose stream test.

See also 
 Listing and approval use and compliance
 Product certification
 Fire door
 Fire test
 Fire-resistance rating
 Passive fire protection
 Fire protection

References

External links 
 German Building Product Approvals – Online Directory
 DIBt treatise on certification listings (approvals)
 DIBt accreditation of certification and testing organisations in Germany
 National Standards System (NSS) Roadmap, by The Standards Council of Canada (scc.ca)
 ANSI Directory of Accredited Product Certification Bodies, Applicants and Suspended Certification Bodies
 ANSI treatise why one should seek accreditation
  Online Certifications Directory from Underwriters Laboratories
 Online ULC Certifications Directory
 ULC Glossary on Certification, Listings and Approvals
 Catalog of Compostable Products Certified by the Biodegradable Products Institute
 FM Approvals, a member of the FM Global Group
 Online  Certified Listing Directory

Passive fire protection
Product certification